The Msunduzi Local Municipality council consists of eighty-one members elected by mixed-member proportional representation. Forty-one councillors are elected by first-past-the-post voting in forty-one wards, while the remaining forty are chosen from party lists so that the total number of party representatives is proportional to the number of votes received. In the election of 1 November 2021 the African National Congress (ANC) lost its majority, obtaining a plurality of forty seats.

Results 
The following table shows the composition of the council after past elections.

December 2000 election

The following table shows the results of the 2000 election.

March 2006 election

The following table shows the results of the 2006 election.

May 2011 election

The following table shows the results of the 2011 election.

August 2016 election

The following table shows the results of the 2016 election.

November 2021 election

The following table shows the results of the 2021 election.

By-elections from November 2021
The following by-elections were held to fill vacant ward seats in the period since the election in November 2021.

In ward 28, a safe Democratic Alliance (DA) seat, the DA councillor, Lucky Naicker, had his membership of the party terminated for sexual harassment. In the resulting by-election, Naicker stood as an independent, but the new DA candidate retained the seat for the party, winning 62% of the ward votes.

The by-election in ward 2 on 8 March 2023, held after the death of the ANC councillor, saw a large swing to the Inkatha Freedom Party (IFP). After the 2021 election, the ANC retained control of the council with the support of the African Independent Congress. With the loss of a further seat, it will now need to rely on the Patriotic Alliance as well to retain control. In the ward 25 by-election on the same day, held after the councillor took up a vacancy in parliament, the DA retained the seat.

References

Msunduzi
Elections in KwaZulu-Natal